Kya Aap Banaingay Crorepati? (English translation: Are you going to be a crorepati?) was a Pakistani game show based on the original British format of Who Wants to Be a Millionaire?. The show was hosted by Moin Akhtar. The main goal of the game was to win 10 million rupees (2002-2004) by answering 15 multiple-choice questions correctly. There were three lifelines - Fifty Fifty, Phone A Friend and Ask The Audience. Kya Aap Banaingay Crorepati? was broadcast from 2002 to 2004. It was shown on ARY Digital. The show was bilingual - in English and Urdu. The show was broadcast on every Saturday at 7:45 PST.

Money tree

Pakistani version (2002-2004)

External links and sources 
Official website (archived)
You Too Can Become a Crorepati (archived)
Entry on ARY Digital website (archived)
Fragment of the show
PakistaniDefence forum

Who Wants to Be a Millionaire?
Pakistani game shows
2003 Pakistani television series debuts
2004 Pakistani television series endings
2000s Pakistani television series
Pakistani reality television series
Pakistani television series based on British television series